Written by the singer-guitarist, Darren Cordeux,"Dinosaur," is a song by Australian rock band Kisschasy. It is the third single released, in January 2010, from their third studio album, Seizures (August 2009), and It reached the top 40 on the ARIA Singles Chart. By the end of that year it was certified gold by ARIA for shipment of 35,000 units.

Music video

A music video has been created for the single. The video was created by a university student and features two animated dinosaurs.

Charts

Certifications

References

Kisschasy songs
2010 singles
2009 songs